Hard infrastructure, also known as tangible or built infrastructure, is the physical infrastructure of roads, bridges, tunnels, railways, ports, and harbors, among others, as opposed to the soft infrastructure or "intangible infrastructure of human capital in the form of education, research, health and social
services and "institutional infrastructure" in the form of legal, economic and social systems.
 
This article delineates both the capital goods, or fixed assets, and the control systems, software required to operate, manage and monitor the systems, as well as any accessory buildings, plants, or vehicles that are an essential part of the system. Also included are fleets of vehicles operating according to schedules such as public transit buses and garbage collection, as well as basic energy or communications facilities that are not usually part of a physical network, such as oil refineries, radio, and television broadcasting facilities.

Attributes 
Hard infrastructure in general usually has the following attributes:

Capital assets that provide services 
These are physical assets that provide services. The people employed in the hard infrastructure sector generally maintain, monitor, and operate the assets, but do not offer services to the clients or users of the infrastructure. Interactions between workers and clients are generally limited to administrative tasks concerning ordering, scheduling, or billing of services.

Large networks 
These are large networks constructed over generations and are not often replaced as a whole system. The network provides services to a geographically defined area, and has a long life because its service capacity is maintained by continual refurbishment or replacement of components as they wear out.

Historicity and interdependence 
The system or network tends to evolve over time as it is continuously modified, improved, enlarged, and as various components are rebuilt, decommissioned or adapted to other uses. The system components are interdependent and not usually capable of subdivision or separate disposal, and consequently are not readily disposable within the commercial marketplace. The system interdependency may limit a component life to a lesser period than the expected life of the component itself.

Natural monopoly 
The systems tend to be natural monopolies, insofar that economies of scale means that multiple agencies providing a service are less efficient than would be the case if a single agency provided the service. This is because the assets have a high initial cost and a value that is difficult to determine. Once most of the system is built, the marginal cost of servicing additional clients or users tends to be relatively inexpensive, and may be negligible if there is no need to increase the peak capacity or the geographical extent of the network.

In public economics theory, infrastructure assets such as highways and railways tend to be public goods, in that they carry a high degree of non-excludability, where no household can be excluded from using it, and non-rivalry, where no household can reduce another from enjoying it. These properties lead to externality, free ridership, and spillover effects that distort perfect competition and market efficiency. Hence, government becomes the best actor to supply the public goods.

Transportation 
In 1990, Grübler discussed the history and importance of transportation infrastructures like canals, railroads, highways, airways and pipelines.

Road and highway networks, including structures (bridges, tunnels, culverts, retaining walls), signage and markings, electrical systems (street lighting and traffic lights), edge treatments (curbs, sidewalks, landscaping), and specialised facilities such as road maintenance depots and rest areas
Mass transit systems (Commuter rail systems, subways, Light rail, ferries, trolleys, City Bicycle Sharing system, City Car Sharing system and bus transportation)
Railways, including structures, terminal facilities (rail yards, railway stations), level crossings, signalling and communications systems
Canals and navigable waterways requiring continuous maintenance (dredging, etc.)
Seaports and lighthouses
Airports, including air navigational systems
Bicycle paths and pedestrian walkways, including pedestrian bridges, pedestrian underpasses and other specialised structures for cyclists and pedestrians

Energy 

The OECD classifies coal mines, oil wells and natural gas wells as part of the mining sector, and power generation as part of the industrial sector of the economy, not part of infrastructure.
Electrical power network, including generation plants, electrical grid, substations, and local distribution.
Natural gas pipelines, storage and distribution terminals, as well as the local distribution network.  Some definitions may include the gas wells, as well as the fleets of ships and trucks transporting liquefied gas.
Petroleum pipelines, including associated storage and distribution terminals. Some definitions may include the oil wells, refineries, as well as the fleets of tanker ships and trucks.
Specialised coal handling facilities for washing, storing, and transporting coal. Some definitions may include Coal mines.
Steam or hot water production and distribution networks for district heating systems.
Electric vehicle networks for charging electric vehicles.

Water management 

Drinking water supply, including the system of pipes, storage reservoirs, pumps, valves, filtration and treatment equipment and meters, including buildings and structures to house the equipment, used for the collection, treatment and distribution of drinking water
Sewage collection, and disposal of waste water
Drainage systems (storm sewers, ditches, etc.)
Major irrigation systems (reservoirs, irrigation canals)
Major flood control systems (dikes, levees, major pumping stations and floodgates)
Large-scale snow removal, including fleets of salt spreaders, snow plows, snowblowers, dedicated dump trucks, sidewalk plows, the dispatching and routing systems for these fleets, as well as fixed assets such as snow dumps, snow chutes, snow melters
Coastal management, including structures such as seawalls, breakwaters, groynes, floodgates, as well as the use of soft engineering techniques such as beach nourishment, sand dune stabilisation and the protection of mangrove forests and coastal wetlands.

Communications 

OECD lists communications under its economic infrastructure Common Reporting Standard codes.
Postal service, including sorting facilities
Telephone networks (land lines) including telephone exchange systems
Mobile phone networks
Television and radio transmission stations, including the regulations and standards governing broadcasting
Cable television physical networks including receiving stations and cable distribution networks (does not include content providers or "cable networks" when used in the sense of a specialised channel such as CNN or MTV)
The Internet, including the internet backbone, core routers and server farms, local internet service providers as well as the protocols and other basic software required for the system to function (does not include specific websites, although may include some widely used web-based services, such as social network services and web search engines)
Communications satellites
Undersea cables
Major private, government or dedicated telecommunications networks, such as those used for internal communication and monitoring by major infrastructure companies, by governments, by the military or by emergency services, as well as national research and education networks
Pneumatic tube mail distribution networks

Solid waste management 

Municipal garbage and recyclables collection
Solid waste landfills
Solid waste incinerators and plasma gasification facilities
Materials recovery facilities
Hazardous waste disposal facilities

Earth monitoring and measurement networks 

Meteorological monitoring networks
Tidal monitoring networks
Stream Gauge or fluviometric monitoring networks
Seismometer networks
Earth observation satellites
Geodetic benchmarks
Global Positioning System
Spatial Data Infrastructure

References

Bibliography
 Larry W. Beeferman, "Pension Fund Investment in Infrastructure: A Resource Paper", Capital Matter (Occasional Paper Series), No.3 December 2008
 A. Eberhard, "Infrastructure Regulation in Developing Countries", PPIAF Working Paper No. 4 (2007) World Bank
 M. Nicolas J. Firzli & Vincent Bazi, “Infrastructure Investments in an Age of Austerity : The Pension and Sovereign Funds Perspective”, published jointly in Revue Analyse Financière, Q4 2011 issue, pp. 34– 37 and USAK/JTW July 30, 2011 (online edition)
 Georg Inderst, "Pension Fund Investment in Infrastructure", OECD Working Papers on Insurance and Private Pensions, No. 32 (2009)

External links

 Body of Knowledge on Infrastructure Regulation
 Next Generation Infrastructures international research programme
 Report Card on America's Infrastructure

Construction
Technology development
Infrastructure